The 16th British Academy Film Awards, given by the British Academy of Film and Television Arts in 1963, honoured the best films of 1962.

Winners and nominees
Source:

Best Film
 Lawrence of Arabia 
Billy Budd
A Kind of Loving
Lola
The L-Shaped Room
The Miracle Worker
The Manchurian Candidate
Only Two Can Play
Phaedra
West Side Story
Une aussi longue absence
Tu ne tueras point
Through a Glass Darkly
Jules and Jim
Hadaka no shima
The Lady with the Dog
The Elusive Corporal
Last Year at Marienbad

Best British Film
 Lawrence of Arabia 
Billy Budd
A Kind of Loving
The L-Shaped Room
Only Two Can Play

Best Foreign Actor
 Burt Lancaster in Birdman of Alcatraz 
Anthony Quinn in Lawrence of Arabia
Kirk Douglas in Lonely Are the Brave
Robert Ryan in Billy Budd
Charles Laughton in Advise and Consent
Franco Citti in Accattone
George Hamilton in Light in the Piazza
Jean-Paul Belmondo in Léon Morin, prêtre
Georges Wilson in Une aussi longue absence

Best British Actor
 Peter O'Toole in Lawrence of Arabia 
Richard Attenborough in The Dock Brief
Alan Bates in A Kind of Loving
James Mason in Lolita
Peter Sellers in Only Two Can Play
Laurence Olivier in Term of Trial

Best British Actress
 Leslie Caron in The L-Shaped Room 
Janet Munro in Life for Ruth
Virginia Maskell in The Wild and the Willing

Best Foreign Actress
 Anne Bancroft in The Miracle Worker 
Jeanne Moreau in Jules and Jim
Anouk Aimée in Lola
Melina Mercouri in Phaedra
Natalie Wood in Splendor in the Grass
Geraldine Page in Sweet Bird of Youth
Harriet Anderson in Through a Glass Darkly

Best British Screenplay
 Lawrence of Arabia - Robert Bolt

References

Film016
British Academy Film Awards
British Academy Film Awards